Strophomenia is a genus of solenogasters, shell-less, worm-like,  marine  mollusks.

Species
 Strophomenia debilis (Nierstrasz, 1902)
 Strophomenia indica (Nierstrasz, 1902)
 Strophomenia lacazei Pruvot, 1899
 Strophomenia ophidiana Heath, 1911
 Strophomenia regularis Heath, 1911
 Strophomenia scandens (Heath, 1905)
Species brought into synonymy
 Strophomenia agassizi Heath, 1918: synonym of Anamenia agassizi (Heath, 1918)
 Strophomenia farcimen Heath, 1911: synonym of Anamenia farcimen (Heath, 1911)
 Strophomenia spinosa Heath, 1911: synonym of Anamenia spinosa (Heath, 1911)
 Strophomenia triangularis Heath, 1911: synonym of Anamenia triangularis (Heath, 1911)

References

External links
 Pruvot G. (1899). Sur deux Néoméniens nouveaux de la Méditerranée. Archives de Zoologie Expérimentale et Générale. (3)7: 461–509, pl. 12-14
 Gofas, S.; Le Renard, J.; Bouchet, P. (2001). Mollusca. in: Costello, M.J. et al. (eds), European Register of Marine Species: a check-list of the marine species in Europe and a bibliography of guides to their identification. Patrimoines Naturels. 50: 180-213 

Solenogastres